Emilia Galotti  is an East German film. It was released in 1958. It is based on the Gotthold Ephraim Lessing play of the same name.

Cast
 Karin Hübner: Emilia Galotti
 Hans-Peter Thielen: Hettore Gonzaga, Prinz von Guastalla
 Gisela Uhlen: Gräfin Orsina
 E.O. Fuhrmann: Marinelli, Kammerherr des Prinzen
 Gerhard Bienert: Odoardo Galotti
 Maly Delschaft: Claudia Galotti
 Horst Schulze: Graf Appiani
 Gerry Wolff: Conti, Maler
 Karl-Heinz Peters: Angelo
 Alexander Papendiek: Pirro
 Eduard von Winterstein: Camillo Rota, einer von des Prinzen Räten

External links
 

1958 films
1958 drama films
German drama films
East German films
1950s German-language films
German films based on plays
Films set in the 18th century
Films set in Italy
1950s German films